Con Air is a 1997 American action thriller film directed by Simon West and starring Nicolas Cage, John Cusack and John Malkovich. Written by Scott Rosenberg and produced by Jerry Bruckheimer, the film centers on a prison break aboard a Justice Prisoner and Alien Transportation System aircraft, nicknamed "con air". It features Steve Buscemi, Ving Rhames, Colm Meaney, Mykelti Williamson, Dave Chappelle, Rachel Ticotin, Danny Trejo, and Monica Potter in supporting roles.

Con Air was released theatrically on June 6, 1997, by Buena Vista Pictures through Touchstone Pictures and was a box office success, grossing over $224 million against a production budget of $75 million. The film received mixed reviews, though the cast, the score and action sequences were praised. The film gained a strong cult following among Nicolas Cage's aficionados. It received Oscar nominations for Best Sound and Best Original Song for "How Do I Live", performed on the soundtrack by Trisha Yearwood.

Plot

Honorably discharged U.S. Army Ranger Sgt. Cameron Poe returns home from Desert Storm to his hometown of Mobile, Alabama, and reunites with his pregnant wife Tricia. However, on the night of the reunion, three intoxicated men attempt to assault Tricia, which leads to him being given a ten-year prison sentence for accidentally killing one of them. Eight years later, Poe is paroled and boards a flight to Alabama on a Fairchild C-123 Provider known as the Jailbird, a converted JPATS prison transport plane. Accompanying him is his diabetic cellmate Mike "Baby-O" O'Dell.

Most of the inmates boarding the flight are being transferred to a supermax prison: mass murderer William "Billy Bedlam" Bedford, serial rapist John "Johnny 23" Baca, Black Guerrilla member Nathan "Diamond Dog" Jones, and professional criminal Cyrus "The Virus" Grissom. The flight is overseen by U.S. Marshal Vince Larkin, who is approached by DEA agents Duncan Malloy and Willie Sims; the latter plans to go undercover to get information from drug kingpin Francisco Cindino, who is being picked up en route.

After taking off, inmate Joe "Pinball" Parker sets another prisoner on fire using smuggled kerosene as a distraction, allowing Grissom and Diamond Dog to take over the plane. They plan to land at Carson Airport as scheduled, pick up and transfer other prisoners, and then fly to a non-extradition country. Sims tries to retake control, but Grissom kills him and takes his gun. Poe and Grissom also put a halt to Johnny 23's rape attempts on the plane's female guard, Sally Bishop.

The plane arrives at Carson City and the inmate exchange commences. The ground crew is unaware that hijackers are disguised as guards and the real guards are forcibly disguised as inmates, gagged to prevent them from revealing the scheme. Amongst the new passengers are Cindino, pilot Earl "Swamp Thing" Williams, and serial killer Garland Greene. The authorities discover the hijacking upon finding evidence in Grissom's old cell and a tape recorder planted by Poe on one of the disguised guards, but are unable to stop the plane from taking off. Meanwhile, Pinball disposes of the plane's transponder, but dies trying to re-board during takeoff.

The inmates plan to land at Lerner Airfield, a remote desert airstrip, and transfer onto another plane owned by Cindino and his cartel. Poe finds Pinball's corpse trapped in the landing gear and writes a message to Larkin on the body before throwing it out. Larkin learns of the news and heads to Lerner after contacting the National Guard. Bedford, raiding the cargo, discovers Poe's identity when reading his parole letter and finding the stuffed rabbit Poe intends to give to his daughter, forcing Poe to kill him.

The Jailbird is grounded at Lerner, with no sign of the transfer aircraft. Poe warns the others of Cindino's past acts of deceit and betrayal, and thus Grissom orders the others to fuel up the plane and get it ready for takeoff. Poe leaves to find Baby-O a syringe to give him insulin, meeting Larkin and informing him of the situation. They discover Cindino planning to escape on a hidden private jet, which Larkin sabotages. Grissom executes Cindino by igniting the plane's fuel. Meanwhile, Greene meets a little girl, but resists the urge to kill her.

As the other inmates prepare the plane, Johnny 23 spots a National Guard convoy approaching and gives the alarm. The inmates find a cache of fully loaded shotguns and rifles in the cargo hold and prepare an ambush. As the National Guard arrives, the inmates launch an assault, resulting in a number of casualties, but Larkin defends the surviving troops using a bulldozer as a makeshift shield, while the surviving inmates flee back onto the Jailbird and take flight.

Poe's identity is revealed when Bedford's body is found. Grissom is about to execute him and Baby-O, when Larkin and Malloy arrive in attack helicopters, damaging the Jailbirds fuel tank. Though Larkin orders the plane to land at McCarran International Airport, Swamp Thing is forced to land it on the Las Vegas Strip, causing mass destruction and killing Johnny 23. Grissom, Diamond Dog, and Swamp Thing escape on a fire truck, pursued by Poe and Larkin on police motorcycles; the chase leads to the deaths of all three escapees. Poe and Larkin form a friendship before the former meets his daughter for the first time and gives her the bunny. As the surviving inmates are apprehended, the only one unaccounted for is Garland Greene, who gambles in a casino.

Cast

 Nicolas Cage as Cameron Poe, a paroled former Army Ranger who works with the authorities to retake the titular flight.
 John Cusack as U.S. Marshal Vince Larkin, a U.S. Marshal who discovers Poe's role in retaking the plane.
 John Malkovich as Cyrus "The Virus" Grissom, a highly-intelligent career criminal and mastermind of the escape plot.
 Steve Buscemi as Garland "The Marietta Mangler" Greene, a notorious serial killer. Director Simon West and Buscemi based the character on real-life serial killers Ed Gein, Ted Bundy, Charles Manson, Jeffrey Dahmer, and John Wayne Gacy.
 Ving Rhames as Nathan "Diamond Dog" Jones, a black nationalist convicted of terrorism and Cyrus' second-in-command.
 Colm Meaney as Agent Duncan Malloy
 Mykelti Williamson as Mike "Baby-O" O'Dell, Cameron Poe's diabetic friend and cellmate.
 Rachel Ticotin as Guard Sally Bishop, the flight's only female corrections officer who is protected by Poe after being attacked by Johnny 23.
 Monica Potter as Tricia Poe, Cameron Poe's wife.
 Dave Chappelle as Joe "Pinball" Parker, a low-level inmate convicted of heroin, armed robbery, and arson charges.
 M. C. Gainey as Earl "Swamp Thing" Williams, a convict with aviation expertise who serves as Cyrus' pilot.
 John Roselius as Deputy Marshal Skip Devers.
 Renoly Santiago (credited as "Renoly") as Ramon "Sally-Can't Dance" Martinez, a transgender inmate convicted of narcotics charges.
 Danny Trejo as John "Johnny 23" Baca, a serial rapist, nicknamed for his number of sex offense convictions.
 Jesse Borrego as Francisco Cindino, a treacherous South American drug baron and terrorist who helps Grissom (offscreen) plot the hijacking. Borrego used Colombian drug lord Pablo Escobar as a basis for the portrayal of this character.
 Nick Chinlund as William "Billy Bedlam" Bedford, a mass murderer convicted for killing his ex-wife's family.
 Angela Featherstone as Ginny.
 Jose Zuniga as DEA Agent Willie Sims
 Landry Allbright as Casey Poe, Cameron Poe's 7-year old daughter.
 Steve Eastin as Guard Falzon, the leader of corrections officers onboard the flight.
 Kevin Gage as Billy Joe, a gangster whom Poe kills in self-defense.

Additional actors include Ty Granderson Jones as Blade, Emilio Rivera as Carlos, Doug Hutchison as Guard Donald, Jeris Lee Poindexter as Watts, David Ramsey as Londell, Conrad Goode as white supremacist inmate Viking, John Diehl as Poe's defense attorney, and Don S. Davis as the motorist whose car Pinball's corpse falls on. Powers Boothe makes an uncredited voice-over cameo in the opening credits as the Army officer at Poe's leaving ceremony. John Cusack's brother Bill Cusack appears as a Las Vegas EMT.

Production

With second unit work beginning on June 24, 1996, principal photography began shortly after at Salt Lake City, on July 1, 1996 and continued until October 29, 1996, at a number of locations. While most of the interiors of the Fairchild C-123 Provider transport aircraft were filmed in Hollywood Center Studios soundstage #7, Wendover Airport in Utah, as the stand in for the fictional Lerner Airfield, was used for the C-123 flying and taxi scenes. Director Simon West chose the barren and remote Wendover area "because it looked like the surface of the moon ... My idea was that it was perfect for the convicts who had been locked up for 10, 20, 30 years in little cells." The old wartime bomber base was also used for the aircraft boneyard scenes while the original swimming pool at the base was used in a scene where Garland Greene was talking to a young girl.

On August 29, 1996, Phillip Swartz, a welder employed by Special Effects Unlimited, a Los Angeles-based firm, was crushed to death at Wendover when a static model of the C-123 used in the film fell on him. The film credits end with "In Memory of Phil Swartz".

Other filming locations included Ogden Airport where the exchange of prisoners is seen. The scene where the aircraft's left wing hits the Fender Stratocaster sign of Hard Rock Hotel and Casino (which later played host to the film's premiere), was filmed using a replicated guitar sign and a Jailbird miniature model. The crash site was filmed in the Sands Hotel before its demolition on November 26, 1996.
Producer Jerry Bruckheimer found the right spot for the climactic finale, originally planned for a crash at the White House, but Las Vegas was more in keeping with the theme and visual pun of convicts "cashing in". "We got very lucky ... The Sands was going to be demolished anyway. They blew up the tower on their own. We arranged to blow up the front of the building." The 2nd Street Tunnel in Los Angeles was also used for the tunnel chase scene near the end of the film.

Three C-123's were used during production and were painted with the Jailbird livery. The actual flying C-123 model used during flight scenes in the film had a series of both military and private owners. In December 2003 it was sold to All West Freight Inc. in Delta Junction, Alaska. On August 1, 2010, the C-123 was destroyed when it crashed into Mount Healy within Denali National Park in Alaska. The three member flight crew was killed in the crash. Another C-123, formerly registered as N94DT, was used for the crash scene in Las Vegas and then scrapped following production. The third Jailbird movie model used for the taxi scenes was later donated by the filmmakers to the Historic Wendover Airfield Foundation, where it remains on display at the ramp as an attraction for visitors.

The film used several highly detailed models at 1/15th scale, and a multitude of military and private aircraft assembled for the desert boneyard scene.

Music

The film featured the Diane Warren-penned LeAnn Rimes hit single "How Do I Live", performed by Trisha Yearwood for the film.

The Con Air soundtrack album omits two songs featured in the film: "How Do I Live", written by Diane Warren and performed by Trisha Yearwood and "Sweet Home Alabama" by Lynyrd Skynyrd. Although a key element of the film, Mick LaSalle of the San Francisco Chronicle noted, "The soundtrack kicks into loud, obtrusive gear ... (and) remains so loud throughout the picture that it practically functions as a distancing device."
 "Con Air Theme" – 1:34
 "Trisha" – 1:04
 "Carson City" – 3:05
 "Lear Crash" – 4:44
 "Lerner Landing" – 3:28
 "Romantic Chaos" – 1:23
 "The Takeover" – 3:52
 "The Discharge" – 1:09
 "Jailbirds" – 0:59
 "Cons Check Out Lerner" – 1:56
 "Poe Saves Cops" – 2:25
 "The Fight" – 0:23
 "Battle In The Boneyard" – 7:41
 "Poe Meets Larkin" – 1:16
 "Bedlam Larkin" – :49
 "Fire Truck Chase" – 4:22
 "Overture" – 4:19

Reception

Box office
Con Air opened June 6, 1997 on 2,824 screens in the United States and Canada and grossed $24.1 million in its opening weekend, topping the US box office. It also opened in the UK, Hong Kong, Israel and parts of Latin America including Brazil and Mexico grossing $5 million for the weekend, for a total worldwide opening of $29 million. In the US and Canada, it grossed $15.7 million in its second weekend and $10.4 million in its third, finishing second and third, respectively.

The film grossed $101.1 million in the United States and Canada, and $122.9 million in other territories, for a worldwide total of $224 million.

Critical response
According to review aggregator Rotten Tomatoes, 58% of 71 critics gave the film a positive review, with an average rating of 5.7/10. The website's critics consensus reads, "Con Air won't win any awards for believability – and all involved seem cheerfully aware of it, making some of this blockbuster action outing's biggest flaws fairly easy to forgive." On Metacritic, the film has a weighted average score of 52 out of 100, based on 23 critics, indicating "mixed or average reviews". Audiences polled by CinemaScore gave the film an average grade of "B+" on an A+ to F scale.

Roger Ebert, reviewing the film for the Chicago Sun-Times, awarded it three out of four stars, saying it "moves smoothly and with visual style and verbal wit." Janet Maslin, reviewer for The New York Times considered Con Air an exemplar of the "thrill ride genre". In contrast, Rolling Stone reviewer Peter Travers decried the "flip, hip"  and ultimately, "depressing ... pandering" present in the treatment. Andrew Johnston, reviewer for Time Out New York, stated: "Leaving The Rock last summer, I thought it seemed physically impossible for a more over-the-top action movie to be made. That was pretty short-sighted of me, since it was only a matter of time until producer Jerry Bruckheimer topped himself as he does with the wildly entertaining Con Air."

Maxim put the film's climactic Las Vegas plane crash at the top of their 2007 list of "The Top Ten Most Horrific Movie Plane Crashes", a decision that was derided by Wired.

Accolades

See also
 List of American films of 1997
 List of films set in Las Vegas

Notes

References

Bibliography

 Bateman, Ronald R. Wendover Wings of Change: A History. Wendover, Utah: Ronald R. Bateman, 2004. .

External links

 
 
 
 
 

1997 films
1997 action films
1997 action thriller films
1997 directorial debut films
1990s prison films
American action thriller films
American aviation films
Cross-dressing in American films
Films about the Drug Enforcement Administration
Fictional portrayals of the Las Vegas Metropolitan Police Department
Films about aircraft hijackings
Films about aviation accidents or incidents
Films about Colombian drug cartels
Films about terrorism in the United States
Films about United States Army Rangers
Films directed by Simon West
Films produced by Jerry Bruckheimer
Films scored by Mark Mancina
Films scored by Trevor Rabin
Films set on airplanes
Films set in the Las Vegas Valley
Films set in Los Angeles
Films set in Utah
Films shot in the Las Vegas Valley
Films shot in Los Angeles
Films shot in Salt Lake City
Films shot in Utah
Films with screenplays by Scott Rosenberg
Touchstone Pictures films
United States Marshals Service in fiction
Golden Raspberry Award winning films
1990s English-language films
1990s American films
Films shot in Monument Valley